Rameshwar Chaurasiya is an Indian politician and member of the Lok Janshakti Party. Chaurasiya was a member of the Bihar Legislative Assembly from the Nokha constituency in Rohtas district as a member of Bharatiya Janata Party.

In October 2020, Chaurasiya joined Lok Janshakti Party and was given a ticket from Sasaram constituency in 2020 Bihar Legislative Assembly election.

References 

People from Rohtas District
Bharatiya Janata Party politicians from Bihar
Members of the Bihar Legislative Assembly
Living people
21st-century Indian politicians
Bihari politicians
Year of birth missing (living people)
Lok Janshakti Party politicians